Freaky Friday is a 2003 American fantasy-comedy film directed by Mark Waters and written by Heather Hach and Leslie Dixon. Based on Mary Rodgers's 1972 novel of the same name, it is the second remake of the same story, and third installment overall in the Freaky Friday franchise. It stars Jamie Lee Curtis and Lindsay Lohan as a mother and daughter, respectively, whose bodies are switched by a mysterious and magical Chinese fortune cookie.

The film was released in theaters on August 6, 2003, by Walt Disney Pictures and distributed by Buena Vista Pictures. It grossed over $160 million worldwide on a budget of only $26 million, marking it a commercial success. It additionally received largely positive reviews from critics, who praised the performances of Curtis and Lohan. The film earned Curtis a Golden Globe nomination for Best Actress in a Motion Picture – Musical or Comedy. It was Disney's third film adaptation of the novel, after the 1976 film, starring Barbara Harris and Jodie Foster, and the 1995 made-for-TV film, starring Shelley Long and Gaby Hoffmann.

Plot
Aspiring teenage musician Anna Coleman lives with her widowed therapist mother, Tess, and younger brother, Harry. Tess is about to marry her fiancé, Ryan, whom Anna has not entirely accepted as she has not properly moved on from the death of her biological father three years earlier.

At school, Anna's English teacher, Mr. Elton Bates, treats her unfairly, giving her an F on every assignment, regardless of how well she does. She is also feuding with Stacey Hinkhouse, her former best friend-turned-nemesis, and a bully. Anna has a crush on a school staff member, Jake, of whom her mother disapproves. Anna also serves as the lead guitarist in the band, Pink Slip, which is scheduled to audition for a spot in Wango Tango at the House of Blues, the same night as the wedding rehearsal, so Tess forbids Anna from going. At a dinner at Pei-Pei's Chinese restaurant, the two get into a heated argument. Pei-Pei's mother interrupts their quarrel by giving them fortune cookies. They both go into separate rooms, read their fortunes aloud, and immediately feel an intense earthquake, to which the rest of the restaurant is oblivious.

The next morning, Anna and Tess wake up in each other's bodies. "Anna" (Tess in her daughter's body) goes to school and begins to fully understand her daughter's woes. She experiences bullying from Stacey and recognizes Mr. Bates as an old high school classmate, realizing that he is treating Anna unfairly as revenge for Tess turning down a prom invitation from him years ago. "Anna" threatens Mr. Bates with reporting him to the school board unless his treatment of Anna stops. Meanwhile, "Tess" (Anna in her mother’s body), after giving her new body a makeover, has difficulty handling the patients. At lunchtime, "Anna" and "Tess" return to the restaurant, but Pei-Pei explains that only showing selfless love for each other will cause the switch to be reversed.

"Tess" attends Harry's parent-teacher conference, where she reads a composition about how much he actually admires Anna, and decides to be nicer to him. "Anna" attempts to make amends with Stacey, but Stacey frames her for cheating on a test, and "Anna" gets sent to detention. When Jake notices "Anna" sneaking out of detention, he offers to help her finish the test. Jake takes "Anna" to the file room in the teachers' lounge, and she realizes that she misjudged him, but he loses his enamoration towards "Anna" after she sabotages Stacey's test by erasing most of the answers and writing "I'M STUPID!" on it. Ryan surprises "Tess" with a talk show interview to discuss her latest psychology book. To disguise the fact that she hasn't read the book, "Tess" goes into an amusing tirade about getting older. "Anna" and Jake watch the interview on television and while she is embarrassed, he is impressed. "Tess" bumps into Jake at his second job, a coffee shop, and they bond over their favorite music.

At the rehearsal dinner, Anna's friends Maddie and Peg, two of her bandmates, try to convince "Anna" to sneak off to the audition, but they are caught by security. Ryan surprisingly gives "Anna" permission to go, explaining that he just wants the kids to accept him, and urges "Tess" to support the band, finally winning her over. Since "Anna" cannot play, "Tess" plays the guitar backstage while "Anna"  mimes along. Realizing her daughter is indeed musically talented, "Anna" promises to treat her daughter's band with more respect, and during the show, Jake becomes enamored with "Anna" again upon seeing her perform.

Back at the rehearsal dinner, "Anna" tells "Tess" to ask Ryan to postpone the wedding, so that her daughter will not have to marry him in her mother's body. Instead, "Tess" proposes a toast, finally accepting Ryan because of how happy he makes her mom. This act of selfless love switches back Anna's and Tess' bodies. Tess and Ryan later marry, she and Anna finally reconcile, realizing how tough their lives are, and Tess allows Anna to start dating Jake.

At the wedding, Pei-Pei notices her mother offering Anna's grandfather, Alan, and Harry two fortune cookies after seeing them argue. She immediately rushes over, tackles them both, and grabs the cookies. During the credits, Anna is playing with her band at Ryan's and Tess's wedding.

Cast

Production

Development
Lohan's character was originally written as goth, but she did not think anyone would relate to that, and decided to dress in a preppy style for her audition. The character ended up being rewritten as a grunge, alt-rock teen.

Ryan Shuck coached Curtis to play the guitar solo for the concert scene. Lohan trained for one year to learn to play the guitar before production. In the final version of the film, both Curtis and Lohan's guitar parts were overdubbed by professional studio musicians.

Casting
Initially, producer Andrew Gunn had hoped that Jodie Foster, who played Annabel in the original 1976 film, would be interested in the role of the mother. Foster declined, citing concerns that her stunt casting would draw attention away from other elements of the film. Jamie Lee Curtis was offered the role of Tess at the last minute, after Annette Bening dropped out for undisclosed reasons four days before filming began. Kelly Osbourne was originally set to play Maddie, but withdrew when her mother was diagnosed with cancer. She was replaced by Christina Vidal. Tom Selleck was originally cast as Ryan but dropped out when Annette Bening dropped out from the film.

Marc McClure, who played Annabel's love interest in the 1976 film, makes a brief cameo as Boris the delivery man. The snapshots in the opening credits are photos of Curtis and her daughter, Annie Guest. In the final scene, Dina Lohan, Lindsay Lohan's mother and manager, makes an appearance as one of the wedding guests. Director Mark Waters also has a cameo holding a baby at the wedding.

Filming
Principal photography began on October 5, and wrapped on December 18, 2002.

Soundtrack 

The orchestral score was written by Rolfe Kent and orchestrated by Tony Blondal. Lohan also recorded a song for the soundtrack, titled "Ultimate".

Reception

Box office
In its opening weekend, the film grossed $22.2 million in 2,954 theaters, finishing second at the box office, behind S.W.A.T. ($37.1 million). The film went on to gross $110.2 million in North America and $50.6 million in other territories for a total of $160.8 million. The film was released in the United Kingdom on December 19, 2003, and opened at number four.

Critical response

Freaky Friday received largely positive reviews from film critics. On Rotten Tomatoes, the film has an approval rating of 88% based on 155 reviews, with an average rating of 7.00/10. The site's critical consensus reads: "Jamie Lee Curtis and Lindsay Lohan charm in Mark Waters' nicely pitched—and Disney's second—remake of the 1976 hit". On Metacritic the film has a score of 70 out of 100, based on 36 critics, indicating "generally favorable reviews". Audiences surveyed by CinemaScore gave the film a grade of A− on a scale of A to F.

Curtis's performance was singled out for praise by many critics. David Ansen of Newsweek noted that "the most startling metamorphosis is Curtis' transformation from fading horror flick queen to dazzling comedienne. She goes on a teenage tear—tormenting Anna's younger brother (who wonders why Mom's acting so weird), getting down and dirty on a TV talk show where Tess is supposed to discuss her book on aging—with fiercely funny conviction". Lisa Schwarzbaum from Entertainment Weekly called her performance "glorious", and A. O. Scott from The New York Times contended that she "does some of her best work ever [in Freaky Friday]". Independent reviewer Nick Davis described her as "so frisky and pouty and incandescent in Freaky Friday, she made the whole movie feel like something special". Her performance was nominated for the Golden Globe Award for Best Actress – Motion Picture Musical or Comedy.

Lohan's performance was also praised. Roger Ebert, who gave the film three out of four stars, described Lohan as possessing "that Jodie Foster sort of seriousness and intent focus beneath her teenage persona". The film earned her the award for Breakthrough Performance at the 2004 MTV Movie Awards.

The transformation scene, however, was criticized. While Ebert noted that Asian American actors were cast in the film simply to "supply magic potions, exotic elixirs, ancient charms and handy supernatural plot points", Nick Schager of Slant Magazine called it "a strange bit of 'Oriental mysticism' stereotyping that seems at odds with the film's thematic focus on tolerance and understanding". From The Village Voice, Ed Park summarized the premise as "some strange racist nonsense".

Home media
The film was released on DVD and VHS on December 16, 2003, by Walt Disney Home Entertainment. It was later released on Blu-ray on March 27, 2018 as an exclusive through the Disney Movie Club program. The film is also available on the streaming service Disney+ after its launch on November 12, 2019.

Accolades 
 Won
 2004 – MTV Movie Award for Best Breakthrough Performance to Lindsay Lohan 
 2004 – Teen Choice Awards for Choice Breakout Movie Star – Female to Lindsay Lohan 
 2004 – Teen Choice Award for Choice Hissy Fit to Lindsay Lohan 
 2004 – Phoenix Film Critics Society Awards for Best Live Action Family Film 
 2004 – BMI Film Music Award to Rolfe Kent
 
 Nominated
 2003 – Satellite Award for Best Actress – Motion Picture Musical or Comedy to Jamie Lee Curtis
 2004 – Golden Globe Award for Best Actress – Motion Picture Musical or Comedy to Jamie Lee Curtis 
 2004 – Saturn Award for Best Fantasy Film 
 2004 – Saturn Award for Best Actress to Jamie Lee Curtis
 2004 – Saturn Award for Best Performance by a Younger Actor to Lindsay Lohan 
 2004 – Saturn Award for Best Writing to Heather Hach & Leslie Dixon
 2004 – Critics Choice Award for Best Family Film – Live Action 
 2004 – Phoenix Film Critics Society Awards for Best Live Action Family Film 
 2004 – Teen Choice Awards for Choice Movie – Comedy  
 2004 – Young Artist Awards for Best Performance in a Feature Film – Leading Young Actress to Lindsay Lohan 
 2004 – Young Artist Awards for Best Performance in a Feature Film – Young Actor Age Ten or Younger to Ryan Malgarini

Possible sequel
In October 2022, Jamie Lee Curtis expressed enthusiasm about making a Freaky Friday sequel alongside Lindsay Lohan after disclosing the two were still in touch when a fan asked her if she was open to exploring the film's story further during an event in Mexico. After news of her statement created buzz online, Curtis revealed on The View a few days later that she had already contacted Disney about it and shared a potential pitch. In the following month, Lohan also expressed interest in returning for a sequel with Curtis if Disney proposed a new film, stating that she loved her and would love to work with the people from the original movie again if she had the chance.

In November 2022, Curtis said they were in talks with the studio and were "both committed to it" but "it's Disney's to make and I think they're interested and we're talking," also commenting that the 2003 film is considered a classic because of its nostalgia among the audience who grew up watching it and she hoped to do it again. In December 2022, Curtis stated that she and Lohan would be getting back together and suggested they were essentially waiting on the studio's green-light. In February 2023, Curtis reiterated the project "is going to happen."

References

External links

 
 
 

Freaky Friday
2003 films
Films about teenagers
2003 comedy films
2003 fantasy films
2000s American films
2000s English-language films
2000s fantasy comedy films
2000s romantic fantasy films
2000s teen comedy films
2000s teen fantasy films
2000s teen romance films
American fantasy comedy films
American teen comedy films
American teen romance films
Remakes of American films
Body swapping in films
Disney film remakes
Films about dysfunctional families
Films about weddings in the United States
Films about wish fulfillment
Films based on American novels
Films directed by Mark Waters
Films scored by Rolfe Kent
Films set in Los Angeles
Films shot in Los Angeles
Films with screenplays by Leslie Dixon
Films about mother–daughter relationships
Walt Disney Pictures films